The Critics' Choice Television Award for Best Actor in a Limited Series or Movie Made for Television is one of the award categories presented annually by the Critics' Choice Television Awards to recognize the work done by television actors. It was introduced in 2012. The winners are selected by a group of television critics that are part of the Broadcast Television Critics Association.

Winners and nominees

2010s

2020s

Multiple nominations
4 nominations
 Benedict Cumberbatch

2 nominations
 Idris Elba
 Hugh Grant
 Mark Ruffalo
 Dominic West

See also
 Golden Globe Award for Best Actor – Miniseries or Television Film
 Primetime Emmy Award for Outstanding Lead Actor in a Limited Series or Movie
 Screen Actors Guild Award for Outstanding Performance by a Male Actor in a Miniseries or Television Movie

References

External links
 

Critics' Choice Television Awards